HMS Tempest (N86) was a T-class submarine of the Royal Navy. She was laid down by Cammell Laird & Co Limited, Birkenhead and launched in June 1941, serving in the Mediterranean theatre until 13 February 1942, when she was sunk by the Regia Marina while on patrol the Gulf of Taranto.

References

Sources
 
 

 

British T-class submarines of the Royal Navy
Ships built on the River Mersey
1941 ships
World War II submarines of the United Kingdom
Lost submarines of the United Kingdom
World War II shipwrecks in the Mediterranean Sea
Maritime incidents in February 1942
Submarines sunk by Italian warships